François Bonnet was a French cyclist. He competed in three events at the 1908 Summer Olympics.

References

External links
 

Year of birth missing
Year of death missing
French male cyclists
Olympic cyclists of France
Cyclists at the 1908 Summer Olympics
Place of birth missing